Mamba is an administrative ward in the Chunya district of the Mbeya Region of Tanzania. In 2016 the Tanzania National Bureau of Statistics report there were 10,563 people in the ward, from 15,462 in 2012.

Villages / vitongoji 
The ward has 3 villages and 13 vitongoji.

 Mamba
 Kisalasi C
 Kisalasi D
 Mamba A
 Mamba B
 Mandumbwi
 Mtande
 Ijiwa
 Mabatini
 Magunga
 Mamba F
 Mamba G
 Mapinduzi
 Mamba E
 Mapinduzi
 Ngwangu

References 

Wards of Mbeya Region